The Vigil is a 1914 American short silent drama film directed by George Osborne and featuring Tsuru Aoki, Sessue Hayakawa, Thomas Kurihara and Mr. Yamato in prominent roles.

References

External links 
 

American silent short films
Silent American drama films
1914 drama films
1914 films
1914 short films
Films directed by George Osborne
American black-and-white films
1910s American films